Prionosciadium lilacinum is a plant species native to the Mexican States of Jalisco and Nayarit. It is common along sunlit roadsides and other disturbed habitats in the region.

Prionosciadium lilacinum is an herb up to 4 m (13 feet) tall. Leaves are up to 35 cm (14 inches) long and 35 cm across, ternate to pinnate with ovate leaflets. Flower are light purple, borne in umbels on the ends of branches. Fruits are ovoid, up to 9 mm (0.35 inches) long.

References

Apioideae
Endemic flora of Mexico
Flora of Jalisco
Flora of Nayarit
Taxa named by Lincoln Constance
Taxa named by Mildred Esther Mathias